Marco Lodadio (born 24 March 1992) is an Italian artistic gymnast. He is a two-time silver medalist in the rings at the World Artistic Gymnastics Championships and the gold medalist in this event at the 2019 European Games held in Minsk, Belarus. He also won the silver medal in this event at the 2019 European Artistic Gymnastics Championships held in Szczecin, Poland. In 2021, he competed at the 2020 Summer Olympics held in Tokyo, Japan.

Career 
In 2019, he won the gold medal in the men's rings event at the 2019 European Games held in Minsk, Belarus.

In 2019, he also won the silver medal in the rings at the 2019 World Artistic Gymnastics Championships held in Stuttgart, Germany. As a result, he qualified to represent Italy at the 2020 Summer Olympics in Tokyo, Japan.

At the 2019 European Artistic Gymnastics Championships held in Szczecin, Poland, he won the silver medal in the rings.

Competitive History

References

External links 

 

Living people
1992 births
People from Frascati
Italian male artistic gymnasts
Medalists at the World Artistic Gymnastics Championships
Gymnasts at the 2019 European Games
European Games medalists in gymnastics
European Games gold medalists for Italy
Gymnasts at the 2020 Summer Olympics
Olympic gymnasts of Italy
Sportspeople from the Metropolitan City of Rome Capital
Gymnasts at the 2022 Mediterranean Games
Mediterranean Games silver medalists for Italy
Mediterranean Games medalists in gymnastics
21st-century Italian people